Texte zur Kunst is a German contemporary art magazine.

History 

Texte zur Kunst was founded in 1990 in Cologne by art historian Stefan Germer and art critic Isabelle Graw. It has been published in Berlin since 2000. Since the death of Stefan Germer in 1998, Graw has acted as publication's sole publisher.

Contents 

Texte zur Kunst is published in the small journal format of 166 x 230 mm and contains approximately 300 pages. Issues are thematic and feature essays, interviews, and round-table discussions that address culture-sector questions relating to contemporary art, socio-political theory, and cultural policy  from an art historical and sociological perspective. Themes focus on areas of art, institutional critique, feminism, media criticism and theory of subjectivity.

The magazine is influenced by the journal October, but differentiates itself by also covering pop-culture. Unlike other art magazines, it aims to critically examine rather than promote art and demystify the production conditions of art.

Editions 

With each issue, Texte zur Kunst offers artist's editions by contemporary artists, which help support the journal's publication.

Editors & Advisory Board 

Editorial staff past & present (partial list):

Isabelle Graw & Stefan Germer (EICs), Isabell Lorey, Astrid Wege, Tom Holert, Clemens Krümmel (EIC), Sabeth Buchmann, Susanne Leeb, Martin Conrads, Esther Buss, André Rottmann (EIC), Mirjam Thomann, Sven Beckstette (EIC), John Beeson, Oona Lochner, Philipp Ekardt (EIC), Hanna Magauer, Caroline Busta (EIC), Anke Dyes, Colin Lang (EIC), Nadja Abt, Katharina Hausladen (EIC), Genevieve Lipinsky de Orlov, Christian Liclair (EIC), Antonia Kölbl, Anna Sinofzik.

The journal is guided by an advisory board appointed by Graw. Members include: Sven Beckstette, Sabeth Buchmann, Helmut Draxler, Jutta Koether, Mahret Ifeoma Kupka, Dirk von Lowtzow, Ana Magalhães, Hanna Magauer, André Rottmann, Irene V. Small, Beate Söntgen, Mirjam Thomann and Brigitte Weingart.

Exhibition 

In 2010, artist's editions from the 20 previous years were shown in the Sammlung Haubrok

Bibliography 

 Erste Wahl. 20 Jahre „Texte zur Kunst“. 2 Bde. Philo Fine Arts, Hamburg 2011.
 1. Dekade. Philo Fine Arts, Hamburg 2011, . (Fundus-Bücher. 200)
 2. Dekade. Philo Fine Arts, Hamburg 2011, . (Fundus-Bücher. 201)

References

1990 establishments in Germany
Contemporary art magazines
English-language magazines
Visual arts magazines published in Germany
German-language magazines
Quarterly magazines published in Germany
Magazines established in 1990
Magazines published in Berlin
Mass media in Cologne